Bryan de la Fuente (born July 1, 1992) is an American soccer player.

Club career

Professional
On August 25, 2010, de la Fuente became the fourth home grown player to sign a professional contract with Chivas USA. On October 23, he made his professional debut in the final game of the 2010 season against the Chicago Fire. De la Fuente was released by Chivas USA in January 2012, and subsequently signed with Mexican Primera División team Club Tijuana.

He returned to Chivas USA for the 2013 season.

In August 2014, de la Fuente signed for Armenian Premier League side FC Ararat Yerevan alongside fellow Los Angeles Misioneros teammates Jamel Wallace and Christian King. On the final day of the Armenian summer transfer window, de la Fuente signed a one-year contract with FC Shirak, but left the club on 30 December 2016.

In 2017, Bryan joined California United FC II where he was a key contributor to the team winning the United Premier Soccer League National Championships in both the Spring & Fall Seasons.

As of February 2018, Bryan joined A.C. Brea in a coaching capacity for their younger division.

On January 9, 2019, de la Fuente signed for USL Championship side Las Vegas Lights.

On April 6, 2021, de la Fuente returned to California United ahead of the 2021 season.

International career
De la Fuente has represented the United States at the U-20 level, playing near 15 games in 7 camps domestic and international. He participated in different international tournaments including the 2010 Milk Cup in Northern Ireland where they were champions.

Career statistics

References

External links
 
 

1992 births
Living people
American expatriate soccer players
American soccer players
Armenian Premier League players
Association football midfielders
Chivas USA players
Club Tijuana footballers
FC Shirak players
Expatriate footballers in Armenia
Expatriate footballers in Mexico
Homegrown Players (MLS)
LA Laguna FC players
Las Vegas Lights FC players
California United Strikers FC players
Major League Soccer players
USL League Two players
USL Championship players
National Independent Soccer Association players
People from Bell, California
Soccer players from California
Sportspeople from Los Angeles County, California
United States men's under-20 international soccer players